Robert Montano is an American film and television actor.

References

External links

Official site

Year of birth missing (living people)
Living people
American male television actors
Adelphi University alumni
People from Bayside, Queens
People from Hempstead (village), New York
Male actors from New York (state)